Istgah (ایستگاه "Station") is the title of an Iranian TV program made in 200 two-minute parts and by motion graphic, animation stand and pixilation techniques by Mostafa Gorbanpoor (director) and Hamid Rajaei  (producer, researcher and writer). This TV series deals with humanistic topics and is addressed at adults.  It was broadcast by IRIB in 2001–2007.

This TV program is the first series, collected various techniques that presents some serious topics of life styles and some humanistic topics successfully.

References

2000s Iranian television series
2001 Iranian television series debuts
2007 Iranian television series endings
Islamic Republic of Iran Broadcasting original programming